Banyaran or Baniaran or Ban Yaran may refer to:
Banyaran-e Amir Haqmorad
Banyaran-e Aziz Morad
Banyaran-e Mirza Hoseyn
Banyaran-e Teymur